Mikael Tørset Johnsen (born 4 July 2000) is a Norwegian footballer who plays as a midfielder for Serie B side Venezia.

Career
Mikael Tørset Johnsen joined Rosenborg in 2015 from Tiller. After impressing during the pre-season matches, he became a regular in the matchday squad and made his debut for Rosenborg on 28 April 2019 in a league match against Molde, coming on as a substitute after 73 minutes. In May he signed a new two-year contract with the club, making him a permanent part of the first team squad.

On 28 August 2020, Johnsen joined Feyenoord U21 on loan for the first half of the season. The loan was later extended for the remainder of the 2020–2021 season. On 26 January 2021, Johnsen joined FC Dordrecht on loan for the rest of the season.

On 26 February 2022, Johnsen signed with Italian club Venezia throughout the 2023–24 season and was immediately loaned to Oakland Roots in the USL Championship until December 2022.

Personal life
He is the son of former footballer Tor Gunnar Johnsen and the younger brother of Dennis Tørset Johnsen.

Career statistics

Club

Honours

Club
 Rosenborg

Norwegian U-19 Championship (1): 2019
Norwegian U-16 Championship (1): 2016

References

External links
 Profile at RBK.no

2000 births
Living people
Footballers from Trondheim
Sportspeople from Skien
Norwegian footballers
Association football midfielders
Norway youth international footballers
Rosenborg BK players
Oakland Roots SC players
Eliteserien players
Norwegian expatriate footballers
Expatriate footballers in the Netherlands
Norwegian expatriate sportspeople in the Netherlands
Expatriate soccer players in the United States
Norwegian expatriate sportspeople in the United States